Luis Antonio Escobar (19 September 1969 – 8 December 1987) was a Peruvian international footballer who played as a striker.

Escobar died in the 1987 Alianza Lima air disaster.

External links

1969 births
1987 deaths
Association football forwards
Peruvian footballers
Peru international footballers
Club Alianza Lima footballers
Victims of aviation accidents or incidents in Peru
Footballers killed in the 1987 Alianza Lima plane crash